Adrián Fuentes González (born 17 July 1996) is a Spanish professional footballer who plays for CD Castellón as a left winger.

Club career
Born in Madrid, Fuentes was an ED Moratalaz youth graduate. In August 2015, he joined Tercera División side EF Alhama on a trial basis, subsequently signing a contract and making his senior debut during the campaign.

In July 2016, Fuentes joined Lorca FC and was assigned to the reserves also in the fourth division. Roughly one year later he moved to another reserve team, Deportivo Alavés B in the same category.

In July 2018, Fuentes was loaned to Alavés' affiliate club NK Istra 1961, for one season. He made his professional debut on 1 October, coming on as a late substitute for goalscorer Ramón Mierez in a 3–0 Croatian First Football League away win against NK Rudeš. His loan was renewed in 2019 and 2020, scoring 4 goals in 36 league games for the club from Pula; he also scored in both legs of a 3–1 aggregate win over HNK Šibenik to retain his team's place in the league, while his tenure was interrupted by injuries.

On 30 January 2021, Fuentes moved to Real Murcia in Segunda División B. He made a free transfer on 18 July to Córdoba CF in the new fourth-tier Segunda División RFEF, contributing 13 goals as promotion was won in his first season.

References

External links

1996 births
Living people
Spanish footballers
Footballers from Madrid
Association football wingers
Segunda División B players
Tercera División players
Primera Federación players
Segunda Federación players
Deportivo Alavés B players
Real Murcia players
Córdoba CF players
CD Castellón footballers
Croatian Football League players
NK Istra 1961 players
Spanish expatriate footballers
Spanish expatriate sportspeople in Croatia
Expatriate footballers in Croatia